Miss Teen Diva is a national beauty pageant in India that annually selects representatives to compete in Miss Teen International, Miss Teen World, Miss Teen Universe, Miss Teen Earth, Miss Teen Multinational and Miss Teen Grand Pageants. The beauty pageant was started in 2020 by the Glamanand Group and was merged with Miss Teen India for three years.

Miss Teen Diva 2020 was the first edition of the beauty pageant, where Rashi Parasrampuria was crowned Miss Teen International India. Wachi Pareek was crowned Miss Teen Universe India, Aishwarya Vinu Nair was crowned Miss Teen Earth India, and Sayali Ayre was Crowned Miss Teen Multinational India.

Miss Teen Diva is India's most prestigious teen pageant, having all the major international teen pageant franchisees under the national pageant.
The reigning Miss Teen Diva(Miss Teen Diva 2021) (Miss Teen International India) is Mannat Siwach, crowned by the outgoing titleholder Rashi Parasrampuria. At Miss Teen Diva 2021, Brunda Yerrabali has crowned Miss Teen Universe India, Rabia Hora as Miss Teen Earth India, and Mahika Biyani was crowned Miss Teen Multinational India.

History
India's representatives to the Miss Teen International beauty pageant were initially selected by the Miss Teen India Pageant, which has Ritika Khatnani as the first winner. Ritika Khatnani represented India at Miss Teen International. She emerged as the first-runner up at Miss Teen International 2018. Aayushi Dholakia succeeded Ritika Khatnani as Miss Teen India and Miss Teen International India and became the first Asian to win Miss Teen International Pageant.

Since 2019, Miss Teen Universe India was also sent by Miss Teen India. Vridhi Jain was the first Miss Teen Universe India. 
In 2020, Glamanand Group announced Miss Teen Diva Pageant and merged Miss Teen India with Miss Teen Diva for the initial years to build Miss Teen Diva.

Representatives to international pageants
Glamanand Group has been selecting India's representatives for this pageant since the year 2018.

References

2020 in India
Beauty pageants in India